Browning Township, Illinois may refer to:

Browning Township, Franklin County, Illinois
Browning Township, Schuyler County, Illinois

Illinois township disambiguation pages